Statistics of Danish National Football Tournament in the 1921/1922 season.

Province tournament

First round
IK Viking Rønne 0-5 Skovshoved IF

Second round
Skovshoved IF 2-3 Boldklubben 1901
Boldklubben 1909 2-5 Aarhus Gymnastikforening (aet)

Third round
Boldklubben 1901 2-1 Aarhus Gymnastikforening

Copenhagen Championship

Final
Kjøbenhavns Boldklub 4-2 Boldklubben 1901

References
Denmark - List of final tables (RSSSF)

Top level Danish football league seasons
1921–22 in Danish football
Denmark